Wu Xingyu (born 27 March 2000) is a Chinese footballer currently playing as a left winger for Shenzhen.

Club career
Wu Xingyu would play for the Shandong Luneng youth team and moved into the senior team before he was loaned to Desportivo Brasil. After being set back with a meniscus injury, Wu was sent to Qingdao Hainiu for the 2021 China League Two season.

On 8 May 2022, Wu would transfer to top tier club Shenzhen before the start of the 2022 Chinese Super League season. He would make his debut for the club on 11 July 2022 in a league game against Beijing Guoan in a 2-1 victory.

Career statistics

Notes

Honours

Club
Qingdao Hainiu
China League Two: 2021

References

External links

2000 births
Living people
Footballers from Anhui
Chinese footballers
Association football midfielders
China League Two players
Shandong Taishan F.C. players
Desportivo Brasil players
Chinese expatriate footballers
Chinese expatriate sportspeople in Brazil
Expatriate footballers in Brazil